Qazi Anwar Hussain (19 July 1936 – 19 January 2022) was a Bangladeshi writer who mainly penned spy thriller, detective and adventure based novels, most of which are adaptations translated from or heavily influenced by foreign literature.

Early life and education
Hussain was born on 19 July 1936. His father was scientist and writer, Qazi Motahar Hossain. Hussain grew up in a literary environment. Some of the more famous members of his family included his late brother Qazi Mahbub Husain, sister Zobaida Mirza (professor and author), his older sister Sanjida Khatun (singer and author), his younger sister Fahmida Khatun (singer and author), and sister Mahmuda Khatun (singer). He received his master's in Bengali literature and language from the University of Dhaka. As a graduation gift, he requested a printing press of his father.

Career in writing
Hussain would often lock himself in his room for hours at length when writing. He created the spy-thriller series Masud Rana, modeled after James Bond. As of 2008, there were more than 400 books in this series.

Sheba Prokashoni
In the middle of 1960, he started a paperback publishing house called Sheba Prokashoni with "four writers", three of whom were his own pen-names.  The publishing house is credited with producing works of world literature, as well as original work.

At first, Sheba meant Segun Bagicha, as well as service. Later, It meant only service. In 1971, the Pakistani militants burnt Sheba. The publishing house gave birth to many successful writers, including Sheikh Abdul Hakim, Rakib Hasan, Niaz Murshed, Asaduzzaman, Masud Mahmud, Khosru Chowdhury, Tipu Kibriya, and Anish Das Opu. Sheba's sister company is Projapoti, the hard bound publisher.

Personal life and death
Hussain was married to singer Farida Yasmin. He had two sons, Qazi Maimur and Qazi Shahnur.

He was diagnosed with prostate cancer on 31 October 2021. On 10 January 2022, he was placed on life support, before suffering a stroke and a heart attack. He died at BIRDEM in Dhaka, on 19 January 2022, at the age of 85.

Works

Masud Rana books
Rana, a spy, a former Major of the Bangladesh Army conducts missions all over the world. His boss is Major General Rahat Khan of Bangladesh Counter Intelligence. Rana works with Rana Agency.(1971).  321 stories in 468 books were published before the author's death. A few titles of this series are given below:

Kuasha series
Anwar's other famous work is Kuasha series of detective/adventure books, which consists of 51 stories in 80 books.

Kuasha is a scientist, detective and adventurer hero who works for the development of science to try to eradicate evils from society and offer a helping hand to the distressed or helpless. In his many adventures, Kuasha worked with detective Shahid Khan, his wife Mahua, friend Kamal Ahmed, and Caretaker Gafur. Mahua is Kuasha's sister, married to Shahid Khan. The Kuasha series revolves around this family dedicated to the service to mankind for peace, love and harmony.

Other works

Non-fiction
 Shothik Niyome Lekhapora (The Right Way of Read Writing)
 Bayam; Dhumpan Tyag E Attoshommohon; 
 Khali Haate Attorokkha
 Mon Niontron
 Atma Unnayan
 Jonopriyota

References

1936 births
2022 deaths
University of Dhaka alumni
Writers from Dhaka
Bangladeshi male novelists
Bangladeshi male writers
Bengali-language writers
20th-century Bangladeshi writers
20th-century novelists
20th-century male writers
21st-century Bangladeshi writers
21st-century novelists
21st-century male writers
St. Gregory's High School and College alumni